Puwakpitiya Grama Niladhari Division is a Grama Niladhari Division of the Seethawaka Divisional Secretariat of Colombo District of Western Province, Sri Lanka. It has Grama Niladhari Division Code 431.

Puwakpitiya is a surrounded by the Egodagama, Kiriwandala North, Kiriwandala South, Puwakpitiya South and Weragolla North Grama Niladhari Divisions.

Demographics

Ethnicity 
The Puwakpitiya Grama Niladhari Division has a Sinhalese majority (69.4%) and a significant Sri Lankan Tamil population (24.3%). In comparison, the Seethawaka Divisional Secretariat (which contains the Puwakpitiya Grama Niladhari Division) has a Sinhalese majority (88.2%)

Religion 
The Puwakpitiya Grama Niladhari Division has a Buddhist majority (65.3%) and a significant Hindu population (21.7%). In comparison, the Seethawaka Divisional Secretariat (which contains the Puwakpitiya Grama Niladhari Division) has a Buddhist majority (81.5%)

References 

Grama Niladhari Divisions of Seethawaka Divisional Secretariat